The 2017–18 West Virginia Mountaineers men's basketball team represented West Virginia University during the 2017–18 NCAA Division I men's basketball season. The Mountaineers were coached by Bob Huggins, in his 11th season as WVU's head coach, and played their home games at the WVU Coliseum in Morgantown, West Virginia as members of the Big 12 Conference. They finished the season 26–11, 11–7 in Big 12 play to finish in a tie for second place. They defeated Baylor and Texas Tech to advance to the championship game of the Big 12 tournament where they lost to Kansas. They received an at-large bid to the NCAA tournament where they defeated Murray State and Marshall to advance to the Sweet Sixteen where they lost to Villanova.

Previous season
The Mountaineers finished the 2016–17 season 28–9, 12–6 in Big 12 play to finish in second place in conference. They defeated Texas and Kansas State to advance to the championship game of the Big 12 tournament where they lost to Iowa State. They received an at-large bid to the NCAA tournament where they defeated Bucknell and Notre Dame before losing in the Sweet Sixteen to Gonzaga.

Departures

Future recruits

2018–19 team recruits

Roster

Schedule and results

|-
!colspan=9 style=| Exhibition

|-
!colspan=9 style=| Regular season

|-

|-

|-

|-

|-

|-

|-

|-

|-

|-

|-

|-

|-

|-

|-

|-

|-

|-

|-

|-

|-
!colspan=9 style=|Big 12 Tournament

|-
!colspan=9 style=| NCAA tournament

|-

Rankings

See also
 2017–18 West Virginia Mountaineers women's basketball team

References

West Virginia
West Virginia Mountaineers men's basketball seasons
West Virginia
West Virginia Mountaineers men's bask
West Virginia Mountaineers men's bask